Calathea roseobracteata is a species of plant in the Marantaceae family. It is endemic to Ecuador.  Its natural habitat is subtropical or tropical moist montane forests.

References

roseobracteata
Endemic flora of Ecuador
Endangered plants
Taxonomy articles created by Polbot